Palmerstown, U.S.A. (shortened to Palmerstown in March 1981) is a television drama series that aired on CBS from March 20, 1980 to June 9, 1981.  It was created by Norman Lear and Alex Haley, whose childhood was the basis for the series.  It tells the story of two nine-year-old boys in the rural Southern community of Palmerstown who become best friends during the Great Depression, despite one being black and the other being white.

Cast
 Jonelle Allen as Bessie Freeman
 Bill Duke as Luther Freeman
 Star-Shemah Bobatoon as Diana Freeman
 Jermain Hodge Johnson as Booker T. Freeman
 Beeson Carroll as W.D. Hall
 Janice St. John as Coralee Hall
 Michael J. Fox as Willy-Joe Hall
 Brian Godfrey Wilson as David Hall
 Kenneth White as The Sheriff
 Iris Korn as Widder Brown (1981)

Episodes

Season 1 (1980)

Season 2 (1981)

See also
Any Day Now

References

External links

Norman Lear
1980s American drama television series
1980 American television series debuts
1981 American television series endings
CBS original programming
English-language television shows
Television series by Sony Pictures Television
Television shows set in Tennessee
Television series set in the 1930s
Television series created by Norman Lear